The NIU Soccer and Track & Field Complex is a multi-purpose stadium located on the campus of Northern Illinois University (NIU) in DeKalb, Illinois, United States. The 1,500-seat stadium is home to the NIU men's and women's soccer and women's outdoor track and field teams. The complex was completed in 2008.

Soccer
The interior of the track houses the pitch for the NIU men's and women's soccer teams. The turf was built to the specification of FIFA 2-Star Certified Field Turf, meaning it is the highest quality artificial soccer surface available.

Track and field
The complex is equipped with an eight-lane track, which includes an eight-lane straightaway. The track surface is made with a state-of-the-art material that is nearly impermeable to damage from rain and snow.

The complex has two large "D" zones, which allows for simultaneous track and field events.

The north zone houses the high jump area. Opposite the high jump area is an area for the pole vault, while the west side of the track is home to three jump pits. The complex's two shot put rings, hammer/discus ring and javelin runway are located to the south of the track.

Other features
The entrance is located on the northwest side of the complex with bleachers located along the east side of the field providing a clear line of sight for the action on the pitch or on the track. Parking is located to the west of the complex in the adjacent NIU Convocation Center parking lot.

References

External links

College soccer venues in the United States
College track and field venues in the United States
Athletics (track and field) venues in Illinois
Soccer venues in Illinois
Northern Illinois Huskies
Buildings and structures in DeKalb County, Illinois
Sports venues completed in 2008
2008 establishments in Illinois